Amana Melome is a Euro-Caribbean-American singer-songwriter currently based in Stockholm. She was born in Germany and raised around the world. After finishing high school in Florence, Italy she returned to America to earn her college degree and graduated from NYU, in New York City. Her music reflects her jazz heritage as she follows in the footsteps of her grandfather, the late bass player Jimmy Woode who was the youngest musician in Duke Ellington's orchestra and accompanied many jazz legends such as Billie Holiday, Ella Fitzgerald and Miles Davis. Her late grandmother was also a jazz vocalist, and her aunt Shawnn Monteiro is still active in the jazz scene today.

Early life
Born in Germany but raised around the world, Melome is a singer, songwriter, actress who sings in Italian, French, German, and English. Having grown up exposed to the music of her family, Melome followed in the footsteps of her grandfather Jimmy Woode, the youngest musician in Duke Ellington's band.

Career
Melome moved to Los Angeles to pursue music after graduating, where she met Saverio "Sage" Principini and recorded her first album Indigo Red and her sophomoric album Phoenix Rising, both recorded at the infamous Henson Recording Studios in Hollywood. After a U.S. release on indie label Savana Records, Amana's Indigo Red became the first CD to be sold in Whole Foods Markets, as they coined her music as "organic" and had her perform a mini-tour of the west-coast stores. Indigo Red was released in Europe on Irma Records in 2008. Following the American and European release of her record, Melome was headlining festivals and clubs, performing for private events for Fendi and Christian Dior before she landed herself a lead role on the most popular Italian sitcom Un medico in famiglia which aired on national TV.

Melome's music is said to evoke the jazz roots of her family with a sound that is a mix of neo-soul, jazz and folk, occasionally mixed with world inspired by her many travels.

Melome has recently finished recording her third album Lock and Key at Manifest Studios in Los Angeles which is due for release in January 2015. The EP brings new collaborations and production by the talented duo Itai Shapira and Adam Berg of the Decoders, who have worked with the likes of Aloe Black and Rhye.

Discography
 2008: Indigo Red
 2011: Phoenix Rising
 2014: Lock and Key

Singles
 2008: Caterpillar, Bella Farfalla, Platonic
 2011: Twisted
 2014: Lock and Key

References 

German women musicians
Living people
Year of birth missing (living people)